Handscapes 2 is an album by The Piano Choir featuring Ron Burton, Stanley Cowell, Nat Jones, Hugh Lawson, Webster Lewis, Harold Mabern, and Sonelius Smith recorded in 1974 and first released on the Strata-East label.

Reception

In his review for AllMusic, Michael G. Nastos simply states "more of the same".

Track listing
Side A:
 "Ballad for the Beast from Bali-Bali" (Hugh Lawson) - 7:04
 "The Need to Smile" (Sonelius Smith) - 6:24
 "Barbara Ann" (Webster Lewis) - 4:47	
Side B:
 "In What Direction Are You Headed" (Harold Mabern) - 6:30
 "Prayer for Peace" (Stanley Cowell) - 8:45

Personnel
Stanley Cowell - piano, synthesizer
Sonelius Smith - piano, electric piano
Ron Burton, Nat Jones, Hugh Lawson, Webster Lewis, Harold Mabern - piano
Mtume, Jimmy Hopps, John Lewis - percussion

References

1975 albums
Stanley Cowell albums
Strata-East Records albums